Les Trois Vallées (The Three Valleys) is a ski region in the Tarentaise Valley in the Savoie department of Southeastern France, to the south of the town of Moûtiers, partly in Vanoise National Park.

Since 1971, it has been possible to ski the interlinked valleys using a single ski pass. Thus, Les Trois Vallées is the largest connected ski area in the world which is linked solely by ski lifts and slopes. In addition, there are 120 km for cross-country skiing. Les Trois Vallées has 183 ski lifts, which can transport 260,000 skiers per hour. Other equipment owned by the operating companies include 2,300 snow cannons and 73 snow grooming machines operated by 160 snow groomers who work in shifts during the night. Other employees in the area include 424 ski patrollers and 3,000 ski instructors.

As implied by its name, the area originally consisted of three valleys: Saint-Bon, Allues, and Belleville. The skiing area has since been extended into a 'fourth' valley, the Maurienne valley. It is adjacent to Val Thorens, but can also be accessed using a long gondola lift from Orelle. The following ski resorts are in Les Trois Vallées:

Tarentaise Valley Skiing
Within the Tarentaise Valley, there are various other resorts such as Paradiski (Les Arcs, La Plagne) and Espace Killy (Val d'Isère and Tignes). A weekly lift ticket in Les Trois Vallées used to allow one to ski one day in each of the other two systems mentioned although this has now been removed. There were once plans to interlink all systems and resorts to create the – by far – largest ski area in the world. However that vision was ended with the creation of the Vanoise National Park.

See also
List of ski areas and resorts in Europe
French Alps

References

External links
Les Trois Vallées official website
(https://www.skiline.co.uk/blog/10-best-ski-runs-in-the-three-valleys) 

Ski areas and resorts in France
Geography of Savoie
Tourist attractions in Savoie
Sports venues in Savoie